Kind of Love is the first long-play record by Japanese rock band Mr. Children The album was issued in December 1992, only 7 months after the release of their debut EP entitled Everything. It has commonly been regarded as the band's second studio album.

Basic tracks for Kind of Love were recorded in the suite of Hilton Tokyo Hotel, and later additional instruments and backing vocals were overdubbed in the studios. The album consists of 11 songs mostly composed by the band's primary singer-songwriter Kazutoshi Sakurai, including some of which co-written by the producer Takeshi Kobayashi or the Jun Sky Walker(s)' bassist Yohito Teraoka. Drummer Hideya Suzuki also contributed one track "Shishunki no Natsu" featuring his lead vocals. It has been one of the only two released songs not sung by a frontman of the group.

Along with the album, "Dakishimetai" was simultaneously released as a single. The lead-off track of the album, "Niji no Kanata e" was later featured as the theme song for the original animated video Shōnan Bakusōzoku 9: Omae to Ore no Good Luck!

Like their first EP, Kind of Love, sold steadily after the band's commercial breakthrough, peaking at #13 on the Japanese Oricon albums chart in February 1995. During the 1990s, It had entered the top-100 for 159 non-consecutive weeks, with estimated sales of approximately 1.2 million copies during its chart run. In 2000, the album was certified quadruple platinum by the Recording Industry Association of Japan, for shipments of over 1.6 million units.

Track listing
All songs arranged by Takeshi Kobayashi and Mr.Children

Personnel
Credits adapted from liner notes of the album
Mr. Children

 Kazutoshi Sakurai – lead vocals, guitar
 Kenichi Tahara – guitar
 Keisuke Nakagawa – bass guitar
 Hideya Suzuki – drums, backing vocals

Guest musicians

 Takuo Yamamoto – baritone, soprano, and tenor saxophones
 Yoichi Murata – trombone
 Toshio Araki – trumpet, flügelhorn
 Hirokazu Ogura – guitar
 Shozo Kimura – guitar
 Shoko Suzuki – backing vocals
 Tomoko – backing vocals
 Hijiri Kuwano Group – string arrangement

Production 

 Takeshi Kobayashi – producer
 Takamitsu Ide, Mitsunori Kadoike – executive producer
 Kunihiko Imai, Hiroshi Hiranuma, and Tsuyoshi Inoue – recording and mixing engineer
 Koichi Inaba – A&R producer
 Makoto Nakanishi – director
 Ken Matsumoto – computer programming
 Sound Sky Studio, Power House, Victor Studio, others – recording
 West Side Studio, Studio Somewhere – mixing
 Hiroshi Tanigawa, Hideyuki Arima, Kenichi Hayashi, Tatsuya Kawakami, and Masatatsu Tsubuki – assistant engineer
 Masterdisk – mastering
 Bob Ludwig – mastering engineer
 Hero Associates Inc. – U.S. production supervisor
 Hiroe Takeshima – recording co-coordination
 Naoki Imoto – promotion
 Masayuki Nakagawa – sales promotion
 Isao Tanuma, Kazushiro Miura – artist management
 Tomoko Okada – desk management
 Tetsuhiko /nono – production management
 Harumi Oshima – production co-ordination
 Chikane Kumagai – P.R. management
 Mitsuo Shindo – art director
 Kumiko Tezuka – designer
 Hiroyuki Ishiee – photographer
 Hiroko Umeyama – stylist
 Akemi Nakano – hair and make-up

Notes

Charts

Weekly charts

Year-end charts

Certifications

References 

1993 albums
Mr. Children albums
Albums produced by Takeshi Kobayashi
Japanese-language albums